Kushtia Medical College is a government medical school in Kushtia, Bangladesh, established in 2011. The college is affiliated with Sheikh Hasina Medical University as a constituent college.

It offers a five-year MBBS degree programme and admits 65 students every year. The commencement of the academic activities started at the MATS, Kushtia temporarily. The permanent campus was started to build in the bank of canal beside the Kushtia-Dhaka Highway and opposite to the Housing #E Block. It is expected the academic and residential options could be supplant to the permanent campus in 2021. KuMC-07th batch is now running their third phase (fourth year)

History 
In 1978-1979, the Bangladesh government planned to establish medical colleges at Bogra, Comilla, Dinajpur, Faridpur, Kushtia, Khulna, Noakhali and Pabna with a view to improve the healthcare services in the country. Subsequently, the programme was abandoned. Than the government felt the need for more medical colleges for medical education facilities. Accordingly, the government committed to establish four new medical colleges at Kushtia, Satkhira, Gopalganj and Kishoreganj with annual intakes of 52 students at each. The college was established in 2011. In 2011 it started educational service in a part of general hospital. Now it is a modern and technology based medical college and it is running with a 250 bed hospital.

Campus
Construction work of a permanent campus of Kushtia Medical College started in 2013 at a cost of Tk. 275 crore. However, due to bureaucratic complications and negligence on the part of the contractor, the construction of permanent campus has been repeatedly extended.

Accommodation
Kushtia Medical College has separate accommodation for boys and girls. The boy's hall is called Rifat-Milon Hostel and the girl's hall is called Rahima-Afsar Hostel.

Clubs, associations, and extracurricular achievements 
Sandhani, KuMC Unit (blood, organ donating charitable organization)
KuMC Photography Club
KuMC Debate Club
KuMC Cultural Society
Humans Of KuMC
Chinnomukul (ছিন্নমুকূল)

See also
 List of medical colleges in Bangladesh

References

Medical colleges in Bangladesh
Hospitals in Bangladesh
Educational institutions established in 2011
2011 establishments in Bangladesh
Organisations based in Kushtia District